Vislanda is a locality situated in Alvesta Municipality, Kronoberg County, Sweden with 1,769 inhabitants in 2010.

References 

http://www.wislanda.se

Populated places in Kronoberg County
Populated places in Alvesta Municipality
Värend